Irura is a genus of the spider family Salticidae (jumping spiders).

Species
As of August 2022, the World Spider Catalog lists 20 species in the genus

Irura bicolor Żabka, 1985 – Vietnam
Irura bidenticulata Guo, Zhang & Zhu, 2011 – China
Irura hamatapophysis (Peng & Yin, 1991) – China
Irura johnmurphyi (Logunov, 2022) – Malaysia (peninsula)
Irura liae (Wang & Li, 2022) – China (Hainan)
Irura longiochelicera (Peng & Yin, 1991) – China
Irura lvshilinensis (Wang & Li, 2020) – China
Irura mandarina Simon, 1903 – Southeast Asia
Irura mii (Wang & Li, 2022) – China (Hainan)
Irura montiformis Gan, Wang & Peng, 2017 – China
Irura onoi (Prószyński & Deeleman-Reinhold, 2013) – Malaysia (peninsula), Indonesia (Borneo)
Irura pengi Guo, Zhang & Zhu, 2011 – China
Irura pulchra Peckham & Peckham, 1901 – Sri Lanka
Irura pygaea (Thorell, 1891) – Malaysia
Irura trigonapophysis (Peng & Yin, 1991) – China
Irura uniprocessa (Mi & Wang, 2016) – China
Irura yinae Gan, Wang & Peng, 2017 – China
Irura yueluensis (Peng & Yin, 1991) – China
Irura yunnanensis (Peng & Yin, 1991) – China
Irura zhangae Gan, Wang & Peng, 2017 – China

References

  (2007): The world spider catalog, version 8.0. American Museum of Natural History.

Salticidae
Spiders of Asia
Salticidae genera